Carl Wilhelm Bøckmann Barth (9 November 1847 – 12 January 1919) was a Norwegian military officer and painter who specialized in marine art.

Carl Wilhelm Bøckmann Barth was born in Christiania (now Oslo), Norway. He was the son of circuit judge Daniel Nikolaj Barth (1810–1880) and his wife   Marie Cathrine Koefoed (1815–1853). Barth served in the Royal Norwegian Navy from  1863 until 1884; retiring as a first lieutenant.

Barth studied painting under Hans Gude at the Karlsruhe in Berlin from 1881 to 1883. He spent part of 1889 and 1890 in London, partly on study trips along the English coast, especially at Dover. He later traveled to Paris and Brittany in 1896 and 1897. He was in  Italy and Tunisia from 1902 to 1903.  In addition, he made numerous study trips along the Norwegian coast as well as to Skagen.
 
Barth served as the director of the Christiania Art Society from 1889 to 1895 and again from 1898 to 1902. He served as the society's chairman from 1898 to 1901. He was  a member of the National Gallery in Oslo and chairman of the Artist Association from 1891 to 1898. He is represented by three works in the National Gallery of Norway; Losbåt i høy sjø (1882), Strand ved Dover (1889), and Marine (1885).

Awards
 Honorable Mention at Paris Exposition – 1889
 Order of St. Olav – 1895

Gallery

References

1847 births
1919 deaths
19th-century Norwegian painters
19th-century Norwegian male artists
20th-century Norwegian painters
Norwegian male painters
Military personnel from Oslo
Royal Norwegian Navy personnel
Burials at the Cemetery of Our Saviour
20th-century Norwegian male artists
Artists from Oslo